West Hyattsville is a Washington Metro station in Hyattsville, Maryland on the Green Line. It is the first station in Maryland northeast on the Green Line, and is located at 2700 Hamilton Street, near the west side of Ager Road and the north side of Queens Chapel Road.

, West Hyattsville served 1.246 million riders annually.

History
The station was originally known as "Chillum" but was changed to "West Hyattsville" in 1979, well before services began on December 11, 1993.

The Yellow Line began serving West Hyattsville as of June 18, 2012 when the Metro Rush+ Initiative was introduced, which extended the Yellow Line from Fort Totten all the way up to Greenbelt, by way of the already existing Green Line Metrorail Train tracks, during weekday rush hour/peak period commuter times. The Yellow Line originally terminated at Mount Vernon Square but was later on extended to Fort Totten on December 31, 2006 as part of a 12-month experiment during off peak commuter times and weekends, at the suggestion of D.C. Councilmember, Jim Graham. Due to its success, this extension of the Yellow Line was made permanent around May, 2008. However; on June 25, 2017, Metro's Yellow Line trains stopped serving the West Hyattsville station due to the elimination of Rush+, which was part of major changes to the Metrorail system.

However; on May 20, 2019, Metro announced that Yellow Line trains will be re-extended from Mount Vernon Square and Fort Totten to Greenbelt at all service hours beginning May 25, 2019.

Station layout

The station is located west of the intersection with Queens Chapel Road and Ager Road. A parking lot, park and ride (formerly the site of the Queens Chapel Drive-In Theater and Mighty Mo Drive-In Restaurant, which closed during the late 1970's), and bus bays are located east of the station's side platforms. The red-brick Kirkwood Apartment Complex and Kirkwood Neighborhood Park can be seen on Ager Road, west of the station site. There used to be an abandoned red brick Palmer Ford Warehouse Building housed on the field right behind the West Hyattsville station, right next to the Kirkwood Apartment Complex. However; that site has been demolished around 2018 to make room for the construction of brand new luxury apartment complexes as part of gentrification taking place in the area. The West Hyattsville station also sits on the former Queens Chapel Municipal Airport Site, which was closed and demolished in 1955.

References

External links
 

 The Schumin Web Transit Center: West Hyattsville Station

Stations on the Green Line (Washington Metro)
Hyattsville, Maryland
Stations on the Yellow Line (Washington Metro)
Washington Metro stations in Maryland
Railway stations in Prince George's County, Maryland
Railway stations in the United States opened in 1993
1993 establishments in Maryland